Eric M. Healey (born January 20, 1975 in Hull, Massachusetts) is an American retired professional ice hockey player. He most last played with EHC Black Wings Linz of the Austrian EBEL and had formerly played in the National Hockey League with the Boston Bruins, appearing in 2 games during the 2005–06 season.

Playing career
Undrafted, Healey was a product of the ECAC's R.P.I. Engineers. He spent four successful years with the Engineers, capturing All-Conference and All-American Honours before signing with the Calgary Flames on September 22, 1998.

Healey split his first pro year with the Flames AHL affiliate the Saint John Flames, and their IHL affiliate the Orlando Solar Bears. In the following summer on July 26, 1999, Healey signed with the Phoenix Coyotes and played for their affiliate, the Springfield Falcons for two seasons. On September 4, 2002, Healey then signed with the Los Angeles Kings, making his mark with the Manchester Monarchs of the AHL with 73 points in 75 games in the 2002–03 season.

Eric then signed with the Atlanta Thrashers to a one-year deal on August 12, 2003. He was however again unable to break into the NHL, playing with farm team the Chicago Wolves. He spent the 2004–05 season abroad with German side the Adler Mannheim.

Healey then returned to North America in the following 2005–06 season and signed with the Boston Bruins on August 15, 2005. He again played primarily in the AHL with the Providence Bruins impressing enough to finally debut in the NHL with the Bruins on November 25, 2005. Healey was also selected as Captain to play for PlanetUSA in the AHL All-Star game.

Considered a career minor-league player, Healey was signed as a free agent on July 15, 2006, by the Tampa Bay Lightning to play for their affiliate, and previous team, the Springfield Falcons. Healey enjoyed his most productive season to date scoring 75 points for the Falcons. The following 2007–08 season, Healey was signed on July 13, 2007, to the Colorado Avalanche. He was assigned to captain the inaugural team of the Lake Erie Monsters of the AHL. Healey led the team in assists (36) and points (58) at the conclusion of the season.

On August 5, 2008, Healey signed with Swedish team Mora IK of the HockeyAllsvenskan. After leading the team with 25 points in just 20 games, Healey was unexpectedly released from his contract on November 25, 2008. On November 28, 2008, Healey signed with Swiss team the SCL Tigers of the NLA, on 1 February 2009 joined to EHC Olten on loan from SCL Tigers.

On September 8, 2009, Healey signed a one-year contract with Austrian team, Graz 99ers of the EBEL for the 2009–10 season. Establishing himself as a top-line center with Graz, Healey led the team and the League in scoring with 67 points while also recording a league best Plus/minus (+31). His standout performance helped the 99ers to a first-place finish in the regular season before suffering a shock first round defeat.

On April 28, 2010, Healey agreed to join rival, EHC Black Wings Linz, as a free agent on a one-year contract to remain in Austria for the 2010–11 season. Despite scoring 13 points in 19 games for the Black Wings, Healey was released from the team to make room in the foreign quota for Jason Ward on November 15, 2010.

Career statistics

Awards and honours

References

External links
 

1975 births
Living people
Adler Mannheim players
American men's ice hockey left wingers
Boston Bruins players
Chicago Wolves players
EHC Black Wings Linz players
Graz 99ers players
Ice hockey players from Massachusetts
Jackson Bandits players
Lake Erie Monsters players
Manchester Monarchs (AHL) players
Mora IK players
EHC Olten players
Orlando Solar Bears (IHL) players
People from Hull, Massachusetts
Providence Bruins players
RPI Engineers men's ice hockey players
Rensselaer Polytechnic Institute alumni
Saint John Flames players
SCL Tigers players
Sportspeople from Plymouth County, Massachusetts
Springfield Falcons players
Undrafted National Hockey League players
AHCA Division I men's ice hockey All-Americans